Victor Frankenstein is a fictional character and the main protagonist and title character in Mary Shelley's 1818 novel, Frankenstein; or, The Modern Prometheus. He is an Italian-Swiss scientist (born in Naples, Italy) who, after studying chemical processes and the decay of living things, gains an insight into the creation of life and gives life to his own creature (often referred to as Frankenstein's monster, or often colloquially referred to as simply "Frankenstein"). Victor later regrets meddling with nature through his creation, as he inadvertently endangers his own life and the lives of his family and friends when the creature seeks revenge against him. He is first introduced in the novel when he is seeking to catch the monster near the North Pole and is saved from near death by Robert Walton and his crew. 

Some aspects of the character are believed to have been inspired by 17th-century alchemist Johann Konrad Dippel. Certainly, the author and people in her environment were aware of the experiment on electricity and dead tissues by Luigi Galvani and his nephew Antonio Aldini and the work of Alessandro Volta at the University of Pavia.

Origin of the character
Percy Shelley, Mary's husband, served as a significant influence for the character. Victor was a pen name of Percy Shelley's, as in the collection of poetry he wrote with his sister Elizabeth, Original Poetry by Victor and Cazire. There is speculation that Percy was one of Mary Shelley's models for Victor Frankenstein; while a student at Eton College, he had "experimented with electricity and magnetism as well as with gunpowder and numerous chemical reactions", and his rooms at the University of Oxford were filled with scientific equipment. Percy Shelley was the first-born son of a wealthy, politically connected country squire, and a descendant of Sir Bysshe Shelley, 1st Baronet of Castle Goring, and Richard Fitzalan, 10th Earl of Arundel. As stated in the novel, Frankenstein's family is one of the most distinguished of the Genevese republic and his ancestors were counselors and syndics. Percy Shelley's sister and Frankenstein's adopted sister were both named Elizabeth. On 22 February 1815, Mary Shelley delivered a baby two months premature; the child died two weeks later. The question of Frankenstein's responsibility to the creature – in some ways like that of a parent to a child – is one of the main themes of the book.

One of the characters of 's novella Le Miroir des événements actuels ou la Belle au plus offrant, published in 1790, is an inventor named "Wak-wik-vauk-an-son-frankésteïn", then abridged as "Frankésteïn", but there is no proof Shelley had read it.

History
Victor Frankenstein was born in Naples, Italy (according to the 1831 edition of Shelley's novel) with his Swiss family. He was the son of Alphonse Frankenstein and Caroline Beaufort, who died of scarlet fever when Victor was 17. He describes his ancestry thus: "I am by birth a Genevese; and my family is one of the most distinguished of that republic. My ancestors had been for many years counsellors and syndics; and my father had filled several public situations with honour and reputation." Frankenstein has two younger brothers—William, the youngest, and Ernest, the middle child. Frankenstein falls in love with Elizabeth Lavenza, who became his adoptive sister (his blood cousin in the 1818 edition) and, eventually, his fiancée.

As a boy, Frankenstein is interested in the works of alchemists such as Cornelius Agrippa, Paracelsus, and Albertus Magnus, and he longs to discover the fabled elixir of life. At the age of fifteen, he loses interest in both these pursuits and in science as a whole after he sees a tree destroyed by a lightning strike and a scientist explains the theory of electricity to him. It seems to him as if nothing can really be known about the world, and he instead devotes himself to studying mathematics, which he describes as "being built upon secure foundations." However, at the University of Ingolstadt in Bavaria, Frankenstein develops a fondness for chemistry, and within two years, his commitment and scientific ability allow him to make discoveries that earn him admiration at the university. He then becomes curious about the nature of life and his studies lead him to a miraculous discovery that enables him to create life in inanimate matter.

Assembling a humanoid creature through ambiguous means, Frankenstein successfully brings it to life, but he is horrified by the creature's ugliness. He flees from his creation, who disappears and, after several negative encounters with the locals, swears revenge on his creator. When William is found murdered, Frankenstein knows instantly that his creation is the killer, but says nothing. The Frankensteins' housekeeper, Justine, is blamed for the boy's death and executed; Frankenstein is wracked with guilt but does not come forward with the truth because he thinks no one will believe his story, and he is afraid of the reactions such a story would provoke.

The creature approaches Frankenstein and begs him to create a female companion for him. Frankenstein agrees, but ultimately destroys this creation, fearing the idea of a race of monsters. Enraged, the creature swears revenge; he kills Henry Clerval, Frankenstein's best friend, and promises Frankenstein, "I shall be with you on your wedding night." The creature keeps his promise by strangling Elizabeth on her matrimonial bed. Within a few days, Frankenstein's father dies of grief. With nothing else left to live for, Frankenstein dedicates his life to destroying the creature.

Frankenstein pursues the "fiend" or "Demon" (as he calls his creation) to the Arctic, intending to destroy it. Although he is rescued by a ship attempting an expedition to the North Pole, he dies after relating his tale to the ship's captain, Robert Walton. His creature, upon discovering the death of his creator, is overcome by sorrow and guilt and vows to commit suicide by burning himself alive in "the Northernmost extremity of the globe;” he then disappears, never to be seen or heard from again.

Characterization
While many subsequent film adaptations (notably the 1931 movie Frankenstein and the Hammer Films series starring Peter Cushing) have portrayed Frankenstein as the prototypical "mad scientist", the novel portrayed him as a tragic figure.

In the book, Frankenstein has many characteristics of a great scientist. At a young age, he has the initiative to study natural philosophy and mathematics.  As an adult, he attributes his accomplishments in chemistry to the effort he put into the discipline, rather than his intelligence. Frankenstein also has great curiosity about the world, and even recalls that some of his earliest memories were his realizations about the laws of nature. It is his curiosity about the cause of life that leads him to creating the monster.

Obsession plays a major role in the development of Frankenstein's character. First, as a child, he is obsessed with reading books on alchemy, astrology, and other pseudo-sciences. Later, as a young man, he often spends the entire night working in his laboratory. He then becomes enthralled with the study of life sciences - mainly dealing with death and the reanimation of corpses. Finally, after the monster is created, Frankenstein is consumed with guilt, despair, and regret, leading him to obsess over the nature of his creation.

In other media

Books
Besides the original novel, the character also appears or is mentioned in other books from pastiches to parodies.

 In the book Frankenstein's Aunt, the Baron's aunt comes to Frankenstein's castle to put it back in order, following the chaos caused by her nephew's experiments. In the novel Frankenstein's Aunt Returns, Frankenstein has created a child for the monster and his bride.
 In Dean Koontz's Frankenstein, Victor Frankenstein – now going by the alias of Victor Helios – has survived into the present, now living in New Orleans while arranging for the creation of his 'New Race' of humanity, now growing his creations in tanks after acquiring funding from the likes of Adolf Hitler, Joseph Stalin and Fidel Castro over the centuries. His creations are mentally and emotionally defective, however, and Helios is forced to kill them, all while convinced that it is due to a flaw in his process rather than being able to acknowledge that his own warped views are the reasons his creations break down due to the hopelessness of their lives and inability to find their own purpose. He is opposed in his 'quest' by his original creation – now called Deucalion, who has mastered the ability to teleport due to the unique circumstances of his creation – and two New Orleans detectives.
 In Kenneth Oppel's novel This Dark Endeavor and its sequel Such Wicked Intent, Frankenstein is portrayed as a 16-year-old aspiring scientist who creates his own creature from the body of his deceased twin brother, Konrad.
 In Peter Ackroyd's novel, The Casebook of Victor Frankenstein, as the protagonist begins conducting anatomical experiments to reanimate the dead, he at first uses corpses supplied by the coroner. But these specimens prove imperfect for Victor's purposes. Moving his makeshift laboratory to a deserted pottery factory in Limehouse, he makes contact with the Doomsday men--the resurrectionists--whose grisly methods put Frankenstein in great danger as he works feverishly to bring life to the terrifying creature that will bear his name for eternity.
 In the 2001 Curtis Jobling book, Frankenstein's Cat, it features Frankenstein, sometime before creating his monster, creating a cat called Nine (named because he was made out of nine cats). This book was later adapted into a television series in 2007.

Film

 Victor Frankenstein's first appearance on screen was in a 1910 film (produced by Thomas Edison) in which he seemed more of a magician.
 The character's first significant film appearance was in Universal Pictures' 1931 film adaptation, directed by James Whale. Here, the character is renamed Henry Frankenstein (a later film shows his tombstone bearing the name Heinrich von Frankenstein) and is played by British actor Colin Clive opposite Boris Karloff as the monster. Clive reprised his role in the 1935 sequel, Bride of Frankenstein, which reunited Clive, Whale and Karloff, as well as first giving Frankenstein the official title of Baron. Although the character is not present in the following sequels due to Clive's death in 1937, an oil painting of Frankenstein (as portrayed by Clive) appears in 1939's Son of Frankenstein; he is also the title character, in spite of having only a cameo, in The Ghost of Frankenstein (1942), where his ghost is portrayed by Cedric Hardwicke (who also plays Henry's son Ludwig Frankenstein in the film).

 The character gained new life in 1957 when Peter Cushing first essayed the role in Hammer Films' The Curse of Frankenstein, opposite Christopher Lee as the Creature. Cushing went on to star as Victor Frankenstein, identified as a Baron, in five more films for the studio, with each subsequent movie in the series uncovering different aspects of the character; for example, in 1958’s The Revenge of Frankenstein he shows genuine concern for the patients of the poor hospital he controls, in contrast to the Baron as portrayed in Frankenstein Must Be Destroyed (1969), where Cushing is a ruthless megalomaniac who utilises blackmail, rape and murder to terrorise those around him.
 The 1967 film Mad Monster Party? featured Baron Boris von Frankenstein (voiced by Boris Karloff) who is based on Victor Frankenstein. Boris discovers the secret to total destruction and plans to reveal it to the Worldwide Organization of Monsters while announcing his retirement. He has a nephew named Felix Flanken, whom he claims is the son of his youngest sister (an expert in witchcraft) and a medicine man, though the film's twist ending reveals him to actually be a sentient automaton built by Boris.
 After Cushing temporarily retired from the role following 1969's Frankenstein Must Be Destroyed, Hammer decided to reboot the series for the 1970s. The Horror of Frankenstein was a tongue-in-cheek black comedy remake of The Curse of Frankenstein, which featured Ralph Bates as a younger, "hipper" Baron in the sinister mold of Cushing's interpretation. After the film failed to be the success Hammer had hoped for, they brought Cushing back for one final film, in 1974's Frankenstein and the Monster from Hell.
 The 1972 TV film Mad Mad Mad Monsters (a "prequel of sorts" to Mad Monster Party?) featured Baron Henry von Frankenstein (voiced by Bob McFadden impersonating Boris Karloff). In the TV film, Henry and his assistant Igor construct and bring to life a female monster, intended to be the original creature's bride. Frankenstein goes to the Transylvania Astoria Hotel in order to make the wedding arrangements.
 Udo Kier played Baron Victor Frankenstein in 1973's Flesh for Frankenstein. This version of the character is a serial killer who is married to his own sister.
 Leonard Whiting played Victor Frankenstein in Frankenstein: The True Story (1973).
 Robert Foxworth played Victor Frankenstein in a 1973 television adaptation Frankenstein.
 In Mel Brooks' 1974 comedy Young Frankenstein, Gene Wilder portrays Frederick Frankenstein, grandson of Victor Frankenstein, who inherits the family estate, but is ashamed of his grandfather's work (to the point of insisting that his name is pronounced "Fronk-en-steen"). He is ultimately inspired to take up the work, eventually creating his own monster (played by Peter Boyle).
 Barrett Oliver portrays a young version of Victor Frankenstein in 1984 short film Frankenweenie, directed by Tim Burton. Charlie Tahan plays Victor in the 2012 animated remake.
 Sting appeared as "Charles" Frankenstein in 1985's The Bride opposite Clancy Brown as the monster.
 Raul Julia portrayed Frankenstein in Roger Corman's Frankenstein Unbound (1990) based on the Brian Aldiss novel.
 In 1992, a TV film adaptation of Frankenstein was produced by David Wickes for Turner Pictures. It starred Patrick Bergin as Victor and Randy Quaid as the monster. In this film, Victor clones himself instead of creating the creature from the dead. In this adaptation, Victor and the monster share a psychic link, and can sense each other's presence.
 Kenneth Branagh reinterpreted the character along the lines of Shelley's portrayal in Mary Shelley's Frankenstein (1994) opposite Robert De Niro as the monster.
 In the 1999 animated film Alvin and the Chipmunks Meet Frankenstein, Dr. Frankenstein is the main antagonist voiced by Michael Bell. After secretly creating the monster in a roller coaster, his lab is discovered by the Chipmunks and he sends his creation after them. After the creature had not returned, he goes to the Chipmunks' house and kidnaps Alvin. He then uses a formula that makes Alvin go out of control. After Alvin is returned to normal, Frankenstein, in disguise as the park's mascot Sammy the Squirrel, tries to electrocute him, but is electrocuted by his own creation. When he regains consciousness, he is unable to get the mask off him. Later near the end of the film, he appears as the theme park's entertainer.
 In the 2004 film Van Helsing, Victor Frankenstein (portrayed by Samuel West) is hired by Count Dracula to create the monster for Dracula to use to bring his offspring to life. When Frankenstein refuses, Dracula kills him, only to be attacked by the monster. The monster takes Frankenstein's body to the windmill, but an angry mob outside of the castle sees the monster and chases it to the windmill. They set fire to the windmill in order to kill the monster, but are chased off by Dracula and his brides. The monster survives when the floor on top of the windmill caves in. The monster – which refers to Frankenstein as his/its father – is later used to bring Dracula's offspring to life, only to escape from the castle with help from monster hunter Gabriel Van Helsing.
 The 2004 independent movie Frankenstein features a Victor Frankenstein known as Victor Helios (portrayed by Thomas Kretschmann), who has used his own research to extend his life into the modern day, where he continues his experiments to create life with the goal of replacing humanity with his own creatures. He is opposed by his original creation, who is determined to defeat his creator while being hampered by a mental 'block' Helios has installed in all his creatures to prevent them from harming him.
 The 2004 Hallmark TV production of Frankenstein starred Alec Newman as Victor Frankenstein opposite of Luke Goss as the monster.
 The 2007 film Frankenstein introduces Victoria Frankenstein. Instead of making the creature out of corpses, she uses stem cells, intending to use her experiment to save her dying son. The experiment goes wrong, however, and the creature escapes. When Frankenstein catches up with the monster, she comes to love it because it is her only remaining link to her son who has since died.
 Victor Frankenstein briefly appears in the 2014 film I, Frankenstein, in which he is played by Aden Young.
 Victor Frankenstein was portrayed by James McAvoy in the 2015 film Victor Frankenstein. In this version, he rescues Igor (Daniel Radcliffe) - formerly an unnamed hunchback from a circus who impressed Victor with his exceptional self-taught medical skills - to enlist him as his partner in creating life, later attributing his desire as a means of making up for a childhood incident where his elder brother died in a blizzard. Although Victor acknowledges that his first human creation has no true spark of life in it, the film concludes with him speculating how he shall improve on his project in the future.

Television
 In the series The Famous Adventures of Mr. Magoo, an episode titled "Doctor Frankenstein" relates the story of Victor Frankenstein and the monster he created.  This episode aired on March 13, 1965.
 Victor Frankenstein is mentioned as the creator of Herman Munster of the series The Munsters, but does not appear in the series. At Herman and Lily's wedding, Frankenstein gave Herman away "with his blueprints." He is currently dead. In "A Visit from Johann," (1966) the episode introduced the great-great-grandson of Victor Frankenstein named Victor Frankenstein IV (played by John Abbott).
 In Carry On Christmas (1969), which was one of the Carry On Christmas Specials on TV, there is a sketch spoofing the Frankenstein story. Terry Scott plays Frankenstein and Bernard Bresslaw plays the monster.
 In an episode of Star Trek: The Next Generation, Guinan alludes that she knew Dr. Frankenstein. 
 In The World's Greatest Super Friends episode "The Super Friends Meet Frankenstein," the Dr. Frankenstein (voiced by Stanley Ralph Ross) that is featured is depicted as the great-great-grandson of the original Dr. Frankenstein who carries on the "family tradition" of creating monsters. He is assisted by an Igor-like henchman named Gore (voiced by Michael Bell). Dr. Frankenstein uses his monsters to take revenge on the Transylvanians for what they did to his ancestor. When he unleashes the classic Frankenstein's monster to attack Transylvania, the Super Friends are called in to investigate. When Batman and Robin attack the monster, Dr. Frankenstein orders his creation to lure the Dynamic Duo to his castle in order to trap them. When Batman and Robin short-circuit Frankenstein's monster, Dr. Frankenstein arrives and traps them while thanking them for giving him an idea for his next creation. First, Dr. Frankenstein transfers Batman's abilities to the target body. Robin manages to escape and calls in Superman and Wonder Woman. When the arrive, Dr. Frankenstein unleashes on them a tentacled, Kryptonite-powered, tar creature. Dr. Frankenstein then transfers Superman and Wonder Woman's abilities into the target body for his next monster. Thus creating a composite monster who has Batman's head, cape, and genius-level intellect, Superman's body and super abilities, and Wonder Woman's magic lasso, magic bracelets, and telepathic powers. Dr. Frankenstein sends his Super-Monster to attack Europe while Robin and Gleek free Superman, Batman, and Wonder Woman. With help from the Austrian Energy Research Institute, Robin undergoes the same experiment that created the Super-Monster granting him the powers of Superman, Batman, and Wonder Woman. Robin and the Super-Monster are evenly matched until Robin dons a lead suit and exposes the Super-Monster to Kryptonite. Robin defeats the Super-Monster while Superman, Batman, Wonder Woman, and Gleek apprehend Dr. Frankenstein and Gore followed by them regaining their powers by reversing the experiment.
 Victor Frankenstein appears in The Transformers episode "Autobot Spike," voiced by Frank Welker. The Autobots see him in a Frankenstein movie.
 The Animated TV series Toonsylvania features a Dr. Frankenstein
 The humorous TV series Frankenstein's Aunt features a Dr. Frankenstein who creates a typical Frankenstein's monster. As in the Universal Pictures' 1931 film adaptation, the character is renamed Henry Frankenstein (portrayed by Bolek Polívka).
 In ABC's fairy tale drama series Once Upon a Time, Dr. Frankenstein (David Anders), originally from a fictional German-themed world called the Land Without Color, is one of many characters brought to the Storybrooke by the Evil Queen under the alias Dr. Whale, named for director James Whale, and serves as a recurring character throughout the show's run. He works at the local hospital, and was responsible for creating the show's version of the monster when he tries to resurrect his dead brother, Gerhardt. 
 The Adult Swim animated series Mary Shelley's Frankenhole features Dr. Victor Frankenstein (voiced by Jeff B. Davis) and other characters from both the novel Frankenstein and other classic horror films. Frankenstein is depicted as being a narcissist who, after drinking an immortality serum he invented, has lived for more than a thousand years. He has developed the technology to connect his village to various points in time, called Frankenholes, that allow various people from history to time travel to visit him in the hopes he will do some sort of miraculous surgery to fix physical and mental flaws.
 The 2014 Showtime series Penny Dreadful depicts Dr. Victor Frankenstein (played by Harry Treadaway) as a young morgue worker in England during the late 1800s. He creates his monster Caliban (played by Rory Kinnear) by attaching a cadaver to a system of circuits and running electricity through it during a lightning storm. Unlike other adaptions, Victor creates two more creations: Proteus and Lily.

Theatre
 The 2007 Off-Broadway musical, Frankenstein – A New Musical portrays Victor Frankenstein as the naïve young student of Mary Shelley's original novel.
 In 2011 the stage adaptation Frankenstein (by Nick Dear) directed by Oscar winner Danny Boyle premiered at the Royal National Theatre in London, starring Benedict Cumberbatch and Jonny Lee Miller, who swapped the roles of Frankenstein and his creature at his representation. The play won numerous awards and massive acclaim from critics and audiences, was recorded live twice to capture both sets of performance, and has been broadcast to cinemas around the world as a part of the National Theatre Live programme.
 Also in 2011, a unique, musical adaptation called Frankenstein's Wedding: Live in Leeds was performed in front of a group of 12,000 at the Kirkstall Abbey. It incorporated footage, filmed prior to the performance, focusing mostly on Frankenstein (played by Andrew Gower) and his creation of the creature, with the live show focusing mainly on Frankenstein's wedding to Liz (played by Lacey Turner), and the tragic story that follows. The show also starred Mark Williams as Alphonse Frankenstein, and David Harewood as The Creature. The show was broadcast live on BBC Three on 9 March.

Computer and video games
 Victor Frankenstein appears in the 1995 graphic adventure computer game Frankenstein: Through the Eyes of the Monster played by Tim Curry in live-action footage that is integrated into the gameplay graphics.
 Victor Frankenstein's in-universe analog or ancestor "Friedrich von Frankenstein" is mentioned multiple times throughout Castlevania: Lords of Shadow'''s main story. Before he died, the Vampire Lord Carmilla had promised to make him suffer for his creations and had carried it out after becoming undead. One of his creations appears as a boss, but unlike the monster, it's a metallic, scorpion-like creature that has no hint of humanity but a large amount of durability. In the first DLC expansion of the main story you find Friedrich's decayed fingers in jars spread out in the Vampire Lord's castle, although you can only find 6 of them.
 Victor Frankenstein is one of the main characters of the Japanese dating sim for females, Code: Realize ~Guardian of Rebirth~ and its sequels (Code: Realize ~Future Blessings~ & Code: Realize ~Wintertide Miracles~).

Web
 A 2014 ongoing web series Frankenstein, MD'', created by PBS Digital Studios and Pemberley Digital, focuses on Victoria Frankenstein, a medical student determined to prove herself in her field. This series gender-swaps several characters—Elizabeth becomes Eli Lavenza and Henry becomes Rory Clerval.

Ballet 
 In 2016, The Royal Ballet and The San Francisco Ballet co-produced an adaptation of Mary Shelley's novel. The evening-length ballet was choreographed and led by the former Royal Ballet principal dancer and Artist in Residence of The Royal Ballet, Liam Scarlett. The ballet features music by Lowell Liebermann, set design by John Macfarlane, lighting by David Finn, and production design by Finn Ross. It held its world premiere at The Royal Ballet's Covent Garden on 4 May 2016 and the SF Ballet premiere on 17 February 2017.

See also
 Frankenstein in popular culture
 Frankenstein's monster
 Mary Shelley

References

Literary characters introduced in 1818
Fictional scientists
Male characters in literature
Male characters in television
Male horror film characters
Fictional mad scientists
Fictional murderers
Fictional alchemists
Fictional necromancers
Frankenstein characters
Fictional Italian people
Fictional Swiss people